The following is the list of names of Vedic Lord Vishnu from Vishnu Sahasranama of Mahabharata.

Names as per the Vishnu Sahasranama 

Anish
Lakshmikanth
Tharun
Vishant
Vishvam
Vishnuh
Vashatkaarah
Narayan
Narada
Bhoota-Bhavya-Bhavat-Prabhu
Bhoota-Krit
Bhoota-Bhrit
Bhaavo
Rangrajan
Bhootaatmaa
Bhoota-Bhaavanah
Pootaatmaa
Paramaatmaa
Muktaanaam Paramaa Gatih
Avyayah
Aymaan
Avyaa
Purushah
Saakshee
Kshetrajnah
Akshara
Yogah
Yoga-Vidaam
Pradhaana-Purusheshvarah
Naarasimha-Vapuh
Shreemaan
Keshavah
Purushottamah
Sarvah
Sharvas
Shivah
Sthaanuh
Bhootaadih
Nidhir-Avyayah
Sambhavah
Bhaavanah
Bhartaa
Prabhavah
Prabhuh
Ieshvara 
Svayambhooh
Shambhuh
Aadityah
Pushkaraakshah
Mahaasvanah
Anaadi-Nidhanah
Dhaataa
Vidhaataa
Dhaaturuttamah
Aprameyah
Hrisheekeshah
Padmanaabhah
Amaraprabhuh
Vishvakarmaa
Manuh
Tvashtaa
Sthavishtah
Sthaviro
Agraahyah
Shaashvatah
Krishno
Lohitaksh
Pratardanah
Prabhootas
Trikakub-Dhaama
Pavitram
Mangalam Param
Eeshanah
Praanad
Praano
Jyeshthah
Shreshthah
Prajaapatih
Hiranyagarbhah
Bhoogarbhah
Maadhavah
Madhusoodanah
Eeshvarah
Vikramee
Dhanvee
Medhaavee
Vikramah
Kramah
Anuttamah
Duraadharshah
Kritajnah
Kritih
Aatmavaan
Sureshah
Sharanam
Jagatheeshwara
Visva-Retaah
Prajaa-bhavah
Ahah
Samvatsarah
Vyaalah
Pratyayah
Sarvadarshanah
Ajah
Sarveshvarah
Siddhah
Siddhih
Sarvaadih
Hadibandhu
Achyutah
Vrishaakapih
Ameyaatmaa
Sarva-Yoga-Vinissritah
Vasuh
Vasumanaah
Satyah
Samaatmaa
Sammitah
Samah
Amoghah
Pundareekaakshah
Vrishakarmaa
Vrishaakritih
Jaggathprani 
Bahushira
Babhrur
Vishvayonih
Shuchi-Shravaah
Amritah
Shaashvatah-Sthaanur
Varaaroho
Mahaatapaah
Sarvagah
Sarvavid-Bhaanuh
Vishvaksenah
Janaardanah
Vedah
Vedavid
Avyangah
Vedaangah
Vedavit
Kavih
Lokaadhyakshah
Suraadhyaksho
Dharmaadhyakshah
Krita-Akritah
Chaturaatmaa
Chaturvyoohah
Chaturdamstrah
Chaturbhujah
Bhraajishnur
Bhojanam
Bhoktaa
Sahishnuh
Jagadaadijah
Anaghah
Vijayah
Jetaa
Vishvayonih
Punarvasuh
Upendra
Vaamanah
Praamshuh
Amoghah
Shuchih
Oorjitah
Ateendrah
Samgrahah
Sargah
Dhritaatmaa
Niyamo
Yamah
Vedyah
Vaidyah
Sadaa-Yogee
Veerahaa
Maadhavo
Madhuh
Ateendriyo
Mahaamayo
Mahotsaaho
Mahaabalah
Mahaabuddhir
Mahaa-Veeryah
Mahaa-Shaktih
Mahaa-Dyutih
Anirdeshya-Vapuh
Shreemaan
Ameyaatmaa
Mahaadri-Dhrik
Maheshvaasah
Maheebhartaa
Shrinivasa
Sataam
Aniruddhah
Suraanando
Govindah
Govidaam-patih
Mareechih
Damanah
Hamsah
Suparnah
Bhujagottamah
Hiranyanaabhah
Sutapaah
Padmanaabhah
Prajaapatih
Amrityuh
Sarva-drik
Simhah
Sandhaataa
Sandhimaan
Sthirah
Ajah
Durmarshanah
Shaastaa
Visrutaatmaa
Suraarihaa
Guruh
Gurutamah
Dhaama
Satyah
Satya-Paraakramah
Nimishah
Animishah
Sragvee
Vaachaspatir-Udaara-Dheeh
Agraneeh
Graamaneeh
Shreemaan
Nyaayah
Netaa
Sameeranah
Sahasra-Moordhaa
Vishvaatmaa
Sahasraakshah
Sahasrapaat
Aavartanah
Nivritaatmaa
Samvritah
Sam-Pramardanah
Ahassamvartakah
Vahnih
Anilah
Dharaneedharah
Suprasaadah
Prasanaatmaa
Vishva-dhrik
Vishvabhuk
Vibhuh
Satkartaa
Satkritah
Saadhur
Jahnuh
Naaraayanah
Narah
Asankhyeyah
Aprameyaatmaa
Vishishtah
Shishta-Krit
Shuchih
Siddhaarthah
Siddhasankalpah
Siddhidah
Siddhisaadhanah
Vrishaahee
Vrishabhah
Vishnuh
Vrishaparvaa
Vrishodarah
Vardhanah
Vardhamaanah
Viviktah
Shruti-Saagarah
Subhujah
Durdurdharah
Vaagmee
Mahendrah
Vasudah
Vasuh
Naika-Roopo
Brihad-Roopah
Shipivishtah
Prakaashanah
Ojas-Tejo-Dyutidharah
Prakaashaatmaa
Prataapanah
Riddhah
Spashtaaksharo
Mantrah
Chandraamshuh
Bhaaskara-Dyutih
Amritaamsoodbhavo
Bhaanuh
Shashabindhuh
Sureshvarah
Aushadham
Jagatas-Setuh
Satya-Dharma-Paraakramah
Bhoota-Bhavya-Bhavan-Naathah
Pavanah
Paavanah
Analah
Kaamahaa
Kaamakrit
Kaantah
Kaamah
Kaamapradah
Prabhuh
Yugaadi-krit
Yugaavartah
Naikamaayah
Mahaashanah
Adrishyah
Vyaktaroopah
Sahasrajit
Anantajit
Ishtah
Visishtah
Sishteshtah
Chaitanya
Nahushah
Vrishah
Krodhahaa
Krodhakrit-Kartaa
Visvabaahuh
Maheedharah
Achyutah
Prathitah
Praanah
Praanadah
Vaasavaanujah
Apaam-Nidhih
Adhishthaanam
Apramattah
Pratishthitah
Skandah
Skanda-Dharah
Dhuryah
Varadah
Vaayuvaahanah
Vaasudevah
Brihat-Bhaanuh
Aadidevah
Purandarah
Ashokah
Taaranah
Taarah
Shoorah
Shaurih
Janeshvarah
Anukoolah
Sataavarttah
Padmee
Padmanibhekshanah
Padmanaabhah
Aravindaakshah
Padmagarbhah
Shareerabhrit
Maharddhi
Riddhah
Vriddhaatmaa
Mahaakshah
Garudadhvajah
Atulah
Sharabhah
Bheemah
Samayajnah
Havirharih
Sarva-Lakshana-Lakshanyah
Lakshmeevaan
Samitinjayah
Viksharah
Rohitah
Maargah
Hetuh
Daamodarah
Sahah
Maheedharah
Mahaabhaago
Vegavaan
Amitaashanah
Udbhavah
Kshobhanah
Devah
Shreegarbhah
Parameshvarah
Karanam
Kaaranam
Kartaa
Vikartaa
Gahanah
Guhah
Vyavasaayah
Vyavasthaanah
Samsthaanah
Sthaanadah
Dhruvah
Pararddhih
Paramaspashtah
Tushtah
Pushtah
Shubhekshanah
Raamah
Viraamah
Virajo
Maargah
Neyah
Nayah
Veerah
Shaktimataam-Shresthah
Dharmah
Dharmaviduttamah
Vaikunthah
Purushah
Praanah
Praanadah
Pranavah
Prituh
Hiranyagarbhah
Shatrughnah
Vyaaptah
Vaayuh
Adhokshajah
Rituh
Sudarshanah
Kaalah
Parameshthee
Parigrahah
Ugrah
Samvatsarah
Dakshah
Vishraamah
Vishva-Dakshinah
Vistaarah
Sthaavarah-Sthaanuh
Pramaanam
Beejamavyayam
Arthah
Anarthah
Mahaakoshah
Mahaabhogah
Mahaadhanah
Anirvinnah
Sthavishthah
A-bhooh
Dharma-Yoopah
Mahaa-Makhah
Nakshatranemir
Nakshatree
Kshamah
Kshaamah
Sameehanah
Yajnah
Ijyah
Mahejyah
Kratuh
Satram
Sataam-Gatih
Sarvadarshee
Vimuktaatmaa
Sarvajno
Jnaanamuttamam
Suvratah
Sumukhah
Sookshmah
Sughoshah
Sukhadah
Suhrit
Manoharah
Jita-krodhah
Veerabaahur
Vidaaranah
Svaapanah
Svavashah
Vyaapee
Naikaatmaa
Naikakarmakrit
Vatsarah
Vatsalah
Vatsee
Ratnagarbhah
Dhaneshvarah
Dharmagub
Dharmakrit
Dharmee
Sat
Asat
Ksharam
Aksharam
Avijnaataa
Sahasraamshur
Vidhaataa
Kritalakshanah
Gabhastinemih
Sattvasthah
Simhah
Bhoota-Maheshvarah
Aadidevah
Mahaadevah
Deveshah
Devabhrit-Guruh
Uttarah
Gopatih
Goptaa
Jnaanagamyah
Puraatanah
Shareera-Bhootabhrit
Bhoktaa
Kapeendrah
Bhooridakshinah
Somapah
Amritapah
Somah
Purujit
Purusattamah
Vinayah
Jayah
Satyasandhah
Daashaarhah
Saatvataam-patih
Jeevah
Vinayitaa-saakshee
Mukundah
Amitavikramah
Ambho-nidhir
Anantaatmaa
Mahodadhishayah
Antakah
Ajah
Mahaarhah
Svaabhaavyah
Jitaamitrah
Pramodanah
Aanandah
Nandanah
Nandah
Satyadharmaa
Trivikramah
Maharshih
Kritajnah
Medineepatih
Tripadah
Tridashaadhyaksho
Mahaashringah
Kritaantakrit
Mahaavaraaho
Govindah
Sushenah
Kanakaangadee
Guhyo
Gabheerah
Gahano
Guptah
Chakra-Gadaadharah
Vedhaah
Svaangah
Ajitah
Krishnah
Dridhah
Sankarshanochyutah
Varunah
Vaarunah
Vrikshah
Pushkaraakshah
Mahaamanaah
Bhagavaan
Bhagahaa
Aanandee
Vanamaalee
Halaayudhah
Aadityah
Jyotiraadityah
Sahishnuh
Gatisattamah
Sudhanvaa
Khanda-Parashur
Daarunah
Dravinapradah
Divah-Sprik
Sarvadrik-Vyaaso
Vaachaspatir-Ayonijah
Trisaamaa
Saamagah
Saama
Nirvaanam
Bheshajam
Bhishak
Samnyaasa-Krit
Samah
Shaantah
Nishthaa
Shaantih
Paraayanam
Shubhaangah
Shaantidah
Shrashtaa
Kumudah
Kuvaleshayah
Gohitah
Gopatih
Goptaa
Vrishabhaaksho
Vrishapriyah
Anivartee
Nivrittaatmaa
Samksheptaa
Kshemakrit
Deva Deva 
Shreevatsa-Vakshaah
Shrevaasah
Shreepatih
Shreemataam
Shreedah
Shreeshah
Shreenivaasah
Shreenidhih
Shreevibhaavanah
Shreedharah
Shreekarah
Shreyah
Shreemaan
Loka-Trayaashrayah
Svakshah
Svangah
Shataanandah
Nandih
Jyotir-Ganeshvarah
Vijitaatmaa
Vidheyaatmaa
Sat-Keertih
Chinnasamshayah
Udeernah
Sarvatah-Chakshuh
Aneeshah
Shaashvata-Sthirah
Bhooshayah
Bhooshanah
Bhootih
Vishokah
Shoka-Naashanah
Archishmaan
Architah
Kumbhah
Vishuddhaatmaa
Vishodhanah
Anniruddhah
Apratirathah
Pradyumnah
Amitavikramah
Kaalanemi-Nihaa
Veerah
Shauri
Shoora-Janeshvarah
Trilokaatmaa
Trilokeshah
Keshavah
Keshihaa
Harih
Kaamadevah
Kaamapaalah
Kaamee
Kaantah
Kritaagamah
Anirdeshya-Vapuh
Vishnuh
Veerah
Anantah
Dhananjayah
Brahmanyah
Brahmakrit
Brahmaa
Brahma
Brahma-Vivardhanah
Brahmavid
Braahmanah
Brahmee
Brahmajno
Braahmana-Priyah
Mahaakramo
Mahaakarmaa
Mahaatejaah
Mahoragah
Mahaakratuh
Mahaayajvaa
Mahaayajnah
Mahaahavih
Stavyah
Stavapriyah
Stotram
Stutih
Stotaa
Ranapriyah
Poornah
Poorayitaa
Punyah
Punya-Keertir
Anaamayah
Manojavah
Teerthakaro
Vasuretaah
Vasupradah
Vasupradah
Vaasudevo
Vasuh
Vasumanaah
Havih
Sadgatih
Satkritih
Satta
Sadbhootih
Satparaayanah

Shoorasenah
Yadu-shresthah
Sannivaasah
Suyaamunah
Bhootaavaaso
Vaasudevah
Sarvaasunilayah
Analah
Darpahaa
Darpadah
Driptah
Durdharah
Athaaparaajitah
Vishvamoortih
Mahaamortir
Deeptamoortir
A-moortirmaan
Anekamoortih
Avyaktah
Shatamoortih
Shataananah
Ekah
Naikah
Savah
Kah
Kim
Yat
Tat
Padam-anuttamam
Lokabandhur
Lokanaathah
Maadhavah
Bhaktavatsalah
Suvarna-varnah
Hemaangah
Varaangah
Chandanaangadee
Veerahaa
Vishama
Shoonyah
Ghritaaseeh
Acalah
Chalah
Amaanee
Maanadah
Maanyah
Lokasvaamee
Trilokadhrik
Sumedhaa
Medhajah
Dhanyah
Satyamedhah
Dharaadharah
Tejovrisho
Dyutidharah
Sarva-Shastra-Bhritaam-Varah
Pragrahah
Nigrahah
Vyagrah
Naikashringah
Gadaagrajah
Chaturmoortih
Chaturbaahuh
Chaturvyoohah
Chaturgatih
Chaturaatmaa
Chaturbhaavas
Chatur-Vedavid
Ekapaat
Samaavartah
Nivrittaatmaa
Durjayah
Duratikramah
Durlabhah
Durgamah
Durgah
Duraavaasah
Duraarihaa
Shubhaangah
Lokasaarangah
Sutantuh
Tantu-Vardhanah
Indrakarmaa
Mahaakarmaa
Kritakarmaa
Kritaagamah
Udbhavah
Sundarah
Sundah
Ratna-Naabhah
Sulochanah
Arkah
Vaajasanah
Shringee
Jayantah
Sarvavij-Jayee
Suvarna-Binduh
Akshobhyah
Sarva-Vaageeshvareshvarah
Mahaahradah
Mahaagartah
Mahaabhootah
Mahaanidhih
Kumudah
Kundarah
Kundah
Parjanyah
Paavanah
Anilah
Amritaashah
Amritavapuh
Sarvajna
Sarvato-mukhah
Sulabhah
Suvratah
Siddhah
Shatrujit
Shatrutaapanah
Nyagrodhah
Udumbarah
Ashvattas
Chaanooraandhra-Nishoodanah
Sahasraarchih
Saptajihvah
Saptaidhaah
Saptavaahanah
Amoortih
Anaghah
Acintyo
Bhayakrit
Bhayanaashanah
Anuh
Brihat
Krishah
Sthoolah
Gunabhrit
Nirgunah
Mahaan
Adhritah
Svadhritah
Svaasyah
Praagvamshah
Vamshavardhanah
Bhaarabhrit
Kathitah
Yogee
Yogeeshah
Sarvakaamadah
Aashramah
Shramanah
Kshaamah
Suparnah
Vaayuvaahanah
Dhanurdharah
Dhanurvedah
Dandah
Damayitaa
Damah
Aparaajitah
Sarvasahah
Aniyantaa
Niyamah
Ayamah
Sattvavaan
Saattvikah
Satyah
Satya-Dharma-Paraayanah
Abhipraayah
Priyaarhah
Arhah
Priyakrit
Preetivardhanah
Vihaayasa-gatih
Jyotih
Suruchih
Hutabhuk
Vibhuh
Ravih
Virochanah
Sooryah
Savitaa
Ravilochanah
Anantah
Hutabhuk
Bhoktaaa
Sukhadah
Naikajah
Agrajah
Anirvinnah
Sadaamarshee
Lokaadhishthaanam
Adbhutah
Sanaat
Sanaatanatamah
Kapilah
Kapih
Apyayah
Svastidah
Svastikrit
Svasti
Svastibhuk
Svastidakshinah
Araudrah
Kundalee
Chakree
Vikramee
Oorjita-Shaasanah
Shabdaatigah
Shabdasahah
Shishirah
Sharvaree-Karah
Akroorah
Peshalah
Dakshah
Dakshinah
Kshaminaam-Varah
Vidvattamah
Veetabhayah
Punya-Shravana-Keertanah
Uttaaranah
Dushkritihaa
Punyah
Duh-Svapna-Naashanah
Veerahaa
Rakshanah
Santah
Jeevanah
Paryavasthitah
Anantaroopah
Anantashreeh
Jitamanyuh
Bhayapahah
Chaturashrah
Gabheeraatmaa
Vidishah
Vyaadishah
Dishah
Anaadih
Bhoor-Bhuvo
Lakshmeeh
Suveerah
Ruchiraangadah
Jananah
Jana-Janmaadir
Bheemah
Bheema-Paraakramah
Aadhaaranilayah
Adhaataa
Pushpahaasah
Prajaagarah
Oordhvagah
Satpathaachaarah
Praanadah
Pranavah
Panah
Pramaanam
Praananilayah
Praanibhrit
Praanajeevanah
Tattvam
Tattvavit
Ekaatmaa
Janma-Mrityu-Jaraatigah
Bhoor-bhuvah
Taarah
Savitaa
Prapitaamahah
Yajnah
Yajnapatih
Yajvaa
Yajnaangah
Yajnavaahanah
Yajnabhrid
Yajnakrit
Yajnee
Yajnabhuk
Yajnasaadhanah
Yajnaantakrit
Yajnaguhyam
Annam
Annaadah
Aatmayonih
Svayamjaatah
Vaikhaanah
Saamagaayanah
Devakee-Nandanah
Srashtaa
Kshiteeshah
Paapa-Naashanah
Samkha-Bhrit
Nandakee
Chakree
Shaarnga-Dhanvaa
Gadaadharah
Rathaanga-Paanih
Akshobhyah
Sarva-Praharanaayudhah
Avyukt
Roma

See also 

 Keshava Namas
 Vishnu Sahasranama
 List of titles and names of Krishna

References 
Vishnu Sahasranamam
Vishnu Sahasranamam with Translation and Meanings

Vishnu, names